Cornelio Sozomeno (Latin:Kornelios Sozomenus) (died 1617) was a Roman Catholic prelate who served as Bishop of Pula (1605–1617).

Biography
Cornelio Sozomeno was born in Venice, Italy. On 31 August 1605, Cornelio Sozomeno was appointed by Pope Paul V as Bishop of Pula. On 11 September 1605, he was consecrated bishop by Giovanni Delfino (seniore), Bishop of Vicenza with Fabio Biondi, Titular Patriarch of Jerusalem, and Metello Bichi, Bishop of Sovana, serving as co-consecrators. He served as Bishop of Pula until his death in 1617 in Venice, Italy.

While bishop, he was the principal co-consecrator of Fabrizio Verallo, Bishop of San Severo (1606), Vincenzo Meligne, Bishop of Ostuni (1606), and Giovanni Battista Bonetti (Berosi), Bishop of Narni (1606).

References

External links and additional sources
 (for Chronology of Bishops) 
 (for Chronology of Bishops) 

17th-century Roman Catholic bishops in Croatia
1617 deaths
Bishops appointed by Pope Paul V